P. Chandra Mohan is an Indian politician who is the chairman of the Gurudeva Trust, Erickavu. He is also the Kerala State Vice President of Human Rights Protection Mission.

He had participated in the Kerala Panchayath Election - Local Body Election 2015 for UDF party at Kumarapuram Panchayath in Alappuzha district and has been elected as Member of Panchayath of ward 13 of Kumarapuram

References

Date of birth missing (living people)
Living people
History of Alappuzha district
Kerala politicians
Politics of Kerala
Year of birth missing (living people)